Louisiana's 27th State Senate district is one of 39 districts in the Louisiana State Senate. It has been represented by Republican Jeremy Stine since 2021.

Geography
District 27 is primarily based in Lake Charles in Calcasieu Parish, taking in nearly the entire city proper as well as the suburban towns of Westlake, Moss Bluff, Prien, Carlyss, and Sulphur.

The district is located entirely within Louisiana's 3rd congressional district, and overlaps with the 33rd, 34th, 35th, and 36th districts of the Louisiana House of Representatives.

Recent election results
Louisiana uses a jungle primary system. If no candidate receives 50% in the first round of voting, when all candidates appear on the same ballot regardless of party, the top-two finishers advance to a runoff election.

2021

2019

2015

2011

Federal and statewide results in District 27

References

Louisiana State Senate districts
Calcasieu Parish, Louisiana